Pseudagrion glaucoideum is a species of damselfly in the family Coenagrionidae. It is found in the Republic of the Congo, the Democratic Republic of the Congo, Equatorial Guinea, Gabon, Ghana, Liberia, Nigeria, and Uganda. Its natural habitats are subtropical or tropical moist lowland forests and rivers.

References

 Clausnitzer, V. 2005.  Pseudagrion glaucoideum.   2006 IUCN Red List of Threatened Species.   Downloaded on 10 August 2007.

Coenagrionidae
Insects described in 1936
Taxonomy articles created by Polbot